RNLD may refer to:
 Resource Network for Linguistic Diversity, an organisation aiming to advance the sustainability of the world's Indigenous languages
 Registered Nurse Learning Disabilities, the title used to designate nurses who are registered with the Nursing and Midwifery Council (NMC)  one of 4 fields of nursing in the United Kingdom

See also 
 RNL Architecture, formerly known as RNL Design, American company